Eagles Super Strikers FC are a Grenadian football club based in Sauteurs. The club most recently competed in the GFA First Division, and were promoted to the GFA Premier Division, the top-tier of football in Grenada, in 2016. The club's home ground is the Fond Recreation Ground in Sauteurs.

References 

Eagles Super Strikers Fc